Fred Gallo (born January 12, 1965) is an American director, producer and writer.

Early life
Gallo attended University of Southern California, receiving a Bachelor of Arts in 1987 and a Master of Arts in 1990.

Films directed
 Writer's Block (1990)
 Dead Space (1991)
 The Finishing Touch (1992)
 Dracula Rising  (1993)
 Lady in Waiting (1994)
 Starquest II (1996)
 Black Rose of Harlem  (1996)
 I Am Woody (2003)
 My Fantastic Field Trip to the Planets (2005)
 Termination Man (1998)
 The Don of 42nd Street  (2009)
 Oddly Popular (TV) (2020)

References

External links

1965 births
Film directors from California
Living people